Acanthascus is a genus of sponges in the family Rossellidae. Species include:

Acanthascus alani Ijima, 1898
Acanthascus cactus Schulze, 1886
Acanthascus koltuni Reiswig & Stone, 2013
Acanthascus malacus Reiswig, 2014
Acanthascus pachyderma Okada, 1932
Acanthascus platei Schulze, 1886
Acanthascus profundum (Koltun, 1967)

References

Hexactinellida
Hexactinellida genera
Sponges described in 1886